Tolisa is a village in the municipality of Modriča, Republika Srpska Bosnia and Herzegovina.

See also 
 Tolisa (river)

References

Populated places in Modriča